Joseph, Joesef is a Scottish singer.

Joesef was born and raised in Garthamlock, Scotland. He played his first show at King Tut's Wah Wah Hut in 2019 after only releasing clips of his music online. He moved to London at the end of 2020. His debut album, Permanent Damage, was released on 13 January 2023.

Personal life 
Joesef is bisexual. He has two older brothers.

Discography 
Studio albums
 Permanent Damage (2023)

Extended plays
 Play Me Something Nice (2019)
 Does It Make You Feel Good? (2020)
 Late To The Party (2021)

Singles
 "Limbo" (2019)
 "Loverboy" (2019)
 "Don't Give In" (2019)
 "Think That I Don't Need Your Love" (2020)
 "The Sun Is Up Forever" (2020)
 "I Wonder Why" (featuring Loyle Carner) (2020)
 "Does It Make You Feel Good?" (2020)
 "Fire" (2021)
 "It's Been a Little Heavy Lately" (2022)
 "East End Coast" (2022)
 "Joe" (2022)
 "Just Come Home with Me Tonight" (2022)
 "Borderline" (2023)

References 

Bisexual singers
Musicians from Glasgow
Year of birth missing (living people)
Living people